The 1953 Winnipeg municipal election was held on October 28, 1953, to elect councillors and school trustees in the Manitoba city of Winnipeg.  There was no mayoral election; mayors were elected for two-year terms in this period, and 1953 was an off year.

There was a total of 18 councillors and 15 trustees in this period, with members elected in alternate years. The councillors and trustees were elected by single transferable vote, with three members elected in each of three wards.  Electors cast ranked ballots where first, second and third choices were marked for the appropriate candidate. 

Three political parties contested this election.  The Civic Election Committee (CEC) was a pro-business alliance of Progressive Conservatives and Liberals, and was the dominant party in Winnipeg's predominantly middle-class first ward.  The CEC claimed not to be a political party as such, but held nomination meetings and ran organized campaigns in a partisan manner.  The socialist Cooperative Commonwealth Federation (CCF) and the communist Labour Progressive Party (LLP) also contested the election.  Both parties were strongest in Ward Three, covering the city's working-class north end.

The CEC won five of the nine contested council seats, down two from their pre-election total.  The CCF gained one council seat for a total of three, while the LPP regained a foothold on council by winning a seat in Ward Three.  The CEC won six trustee seats, the CCF two, and the LPP one.

Council Results

Ward One

The CCF attempted to break the CEC's hold over Ward One by fielding only one candidate, in an effort to avoid vote-splitting among supporters.  This tactic had proven successful the previous year, when CCF candidate David Mulligan was elected to the second position.  Ernest Draffin was not able to repeat this success, however, and all three CEC incumbents were re-elected.  The quota for election was 5,322 votes (25%).

Party Totals

First Count

Simonite and Chown were declared elected, and Simonite's surplus 1,294 votes were distributed as follows: McCreery 1177, Draffin 117.  McCreery was declared elected on the second count.

Second Count

Ward Two
Veteran CCF alderman V.B. Anderson was the only incumbent seeking re-election in this ward, as the two CEC incumbents had both announced their retirement.  The CEC and CCF both ran two candidates, effectively giving each party a bye for one of the positions.  Former Member of the Legislative Assembly (MLA) Gordon Fines finished second, and gave the CCF a second seat in the ward.  LPP candidate William Cecil Ross, the leader of the provincial party, fared poorly outside of his party's north-end base.  The quota for election was 3,783 votes (25%).

Party Totals

First Count

Second Count

Ross, being the least-popular candidate, was eliminated. 
His 635 votes were distributed as follows: Fines 134, Anderson 134, Bennett 88.  279 of his votes were non-transferable.

Goodman exceeded quota and was declared elected.  

Third Count

Goodman's surplus 185 votes were distributed as follows: Bennett 121, Anderson 41, Fines 23.  

Bennett remaining the lowest-ranking candidate, he was to be eliminated. this would leave only two candidates remaining and two open seats. Fines and Anderson were declared elected after the third count.

Ward Three
The CEC fielded a full slate of three candidates in this ward, with the intention of re-electing both of their incumbents.  They succeeded in with Slaw Rebchuk, but lost their other seat to longtime LPP politician Jacob Penner.  Penner, himself a veteran member of the council, had been defeated by CEC candidate Stan Carrick in the 1952 election; his victory in 1953 returned the LPP to council representation after a year's absence.  The CCF retained their seat without difficulty, as council incumbent Jack Blumberg finished in first place.  The CCF's decision to field only two candidates likely benefited Penner's campaign.  The quota for election was 4,715 votes (25%).

Party Totals

First Count

Blumberg was declared elected to the first position, and his 391 surplus votes were distributed as follows: Stevens 184, Penner 80, Wagner 75, Rebchuk 36, Mazapa 16.

Second Count

Stevens was eliminated, and his 1,625 votes were distributed as follows: Wagner 441, Penner 238, Rebchuk 158, Mazapa 91.  697 votes were non-transferable.

Third Count

Fourth Count

Mazapa was eliminated, and his 1,933 votes were transferred as follows: Rebchuk 938, Wagner 285, Penner 125.  585 votes were non-transferable.  

Penner and Rebchuk were declared elected after the fourth count  as Wagner's elimination would leave only two candidates remaining and two open seats.

Wagner's votes and Rebchuk's surplus were not transferred, as it would not have effected the result.

Trustee results

Ward One

The school trustee election in Ward One yielded essentially the same result as the council election.  The CCF ran a single candidate to prevent vote splitting, but the CEC nevertheless retained all three positions.  The quota for election was 5,278 votes (25%).

Party Totals

First Count

Tennant's surplus 1,999 votes were distributed as follows: McAskill 1483, Gladstone 516.  McAskill was declared elected to the third position.

First Count

Ward Two
The CEC and CCF each fielded two candidates, effectively giving both parties a bye for one of the seats.  The CEC's two incumbents were re-elected without difficulty, while CCF candidate Walter Seaberg finally won a seat after a number of failed attempts.  The LPP again fared poorly outside of their Ward Three base.  It is notable that the LPP candidate was Roland Penner, who later left the Communist movement and served as Manitoba's Attorney-General in the 1980s.  The quota for election was 3,752 votes (25%).

Party Totals

First Count

Murphy's surplus 2,119 votes were distributed as follows: Malcolm 1745, Seaberg 192, Vandurme 99, Penner 83.  Malcolm and Seaberg were both declared elected.

Second Count

Ward Three
LPP candidate Joseph Zuken topped the polls to win the first trustee position in north-end Winnipeg.  The CEC and CCF both fielded two candidates, and won one seat apiece.  Zuken's victory may be credited to his personal popularity and reputation as a diligent worker, as well as to the LPP's general base of support.  The quota for election was 4,658 votes (25%).

Party Totals

First Count

Luginsky was eliminated, and his 2661 votes were distributed as follows: Hatcher 1198, Zaharychuk 262, Bachynski 240.  961 votes were not transferred.  Zaharychuk and Hatcher were declared elected.  Zuken's surplus was not transferred, as it would not have made a difference to the outcome.

1953
1953 elections in Canada
1953 in Manitoba
October 1953 events in Canada